Oneil John Carlier  (born June 22, 1962) is a Canadian politician who was elected in the 2015 Alberta general election to the Legislative Assembly of Alberta representing the electoral district of Whitecourt-Ste. Anne, serving until April 30, 2019. He was Minister of Agriculture and Minister of Forestry in the Alberta Cabinet. He is from the community of Darwell, which is located within Lac Ste. Anne County.

Electoral history

2019 general election

2015 general election

References

Alberta New Democratic Party MLAs
Living people
Members of the Executive Council of Alberta
People from Lac Ste. Anne County
1960s births
21st-century Canadian politicians